József Gál (20 April 1918 – 2 February 2003) was a Hungarian wrestler. He competed in the men's freestyle lightweight at the 1952 Summer Olympics.

References

External links
 

1918 births
2003 deaths
Hungarian male sport wrestlers
Olympic wrestlers of Hungary
Wrestlers at the 1952 Summer Olympics
People from Cegléd
Sportspeople from Pest County
20th-century Hungarian people